Annerine Wenhold (born 26 September 1973) is a South African professional racing cyclist. She rode at the 2015 UCI Track Cycling World Championships.

Major results
2015
African Track Championships
1st  Sprint
1st  Team Sprint
1st  500m Time Trial

References

External links

1973 births
Living people
South African female cyclists
Place of birth missing (living people)